On 14 December 2007, a gunman opened fire in a gym in Sasebo, Nagasaki Prefecture, Japan, killing two people and wounding six others, among them two children. 37-year-old Masayoshi Magome, the shooter, was found dead in a nearby Catholic church the following day, having apparently committed suicide.

Attack 
At around 7:00 p.m. in local time, a masked man dressed in camouflaged clothing and armed with a Beretta AL391 shotgun opened fire in the Renaissance Sports Club during a swimming class, firing a total of ten shots. A 26-year-old woman, swimming instructor Mai Kuramoto, died at the scene, and a critically wounded 36-year-old man, fishing equipment maker Yuji Fujimoto, later died at the hospital. Another six people were injured, two of them girls aged 9 and 10. The gunman briefly held remaining gym-goers hostage before fleeing.

Aftermath 
The prefectural police departments of Nagasaki and neighboring Fukuoka deployed the Special Assault Team shortly after the incident. At 1:00 a.m., the perpetrator's car was found parked outside a Catholic church near the gym where the shooting took place. At 6:00 a.m., a gunshot was heard inside, and at 7:30 a.m. his body was found.

The perpetrator, Masayoshi Magome, was a 37-year-old unemployed man who lived with his parents and had a history of mental illness. His family was Catholic but he did not attend church services regularly. Investigators claimed that Magome was friends with Kuramoto and Fujimoto, the two people killed, and often ate at their homes. He had a permit for three shotguns and an air gun. The police allegedly received several complaints from Magome's neighbors that he roamed the city while carrying his guns.

Due to his death, prosecutors dropped the case against Magome and ceased investigations in March 2008. His motive was presumed to be "despair over mounting debts".

References 

Mass shootings in Japan
2007 murders in Japan
2007 mass shootings in Asia
December 2007 events in Asia
Sasebo